Julian Butler (born 15 Aug 1970) is an English composer, lyricist and writer. He is best known for his work in children's theatre.

Career 
Butler wrote the script, lyrics and co-wrote the music for  Space Family Robinson, a musical starring Hannah Waddingham. It premiered at the  Pleasance Theatre, London in 2002.

As a composer and lyricist, he has specialised in work for young audiences, most notably on the Charlie and Lola stage shows Charlie and Lola's Best Bestest Play and Charlie and Lola's Extremely New Play.

He has worked for Polka Theatre, providing music, lyrics and sound design to over 50 productions, including The Wind in the Willows, Julia Donaldson's The Everywhere Bear and The Paper Dolls.

From 2003-2011, Butler was lead singer with rock band Viper Squadron, who released their debut album Attack of the Vapours in 2006.

In 2011, he wrote music and lyrics for a new musical version of Red Riding Hood with  Mike Kenny which premiered at the Djanogly Theatre, Nottingham on 10 December 2011.

In 2013 he wrote and recorded the song "Time Stands Still" featuring vocals by David McAlmont.

In 2015, he wrote the book, lyrics and music for Neverland, a musical based on J.M. Barrie's 1904 play Peter and Wendy. It premiered at the Djanogly Theatre, Nottingham on 4 December 2015.

Awards 
Butler was given the ACA Members Award for his contribution to children's theatre at the 2016 JM Barrie Awards.

Selected discography

References

External links 
 Julian Butler Official website
 Julian Butler on Spotify
 Mary McElree performs "Neverland" on Good Morning Texas
 "Time Stands Still" featuring David McAlmont on Spotify

 Living people
 1970 births
 People from Maidstone
Musical theatre